The 1995 Seattle Mariners season was the 19th in the history of the franchise. They had tied the California Angels for first place, and in the one-game tiebreaker, the Mariners defeated the Angels 9–1 to make the postseason for the first time in franchise history.

In the postseason, the Mariners defeated the New York Yankees in the best-of-five American League Division Series after losing the first two games in New York, a series notable for Edgar Martínez' walk-off 11th-inning double in the fifth game. In the League Championship Series with the favored Cleveland Indians, Seattle won the opener at home and the third game on the road,  but fell in six games.

Offseason
 October 14, 1994: Alex Diaz was selected off waivers by the Mariners from the Milwaukee Brewers.
 November 29, 1994: Félix Fermín was signed as a free agent with the Mariners.
 December 21, 1994: Jay Buhner was signed as a free agent with the Mariners.
 December 21, 1994: Eric Anthony was released by the Mariners.

Regular season
Ken Griffey Jr. suffered a severe left wrist injury on May 26 while making a catch at the wall that sidelined him until mid-August. The Mariners stayed afloat at around .500, and their historic late season comeback tied the California Angels.
The Mariners honored the West Coast Negro Baseball League Seattle Steelheads when they wore 1946 Steelheads uniforms on September 9, 1995, at home against the Kansas City Royals. The Royals wore Kansas City Monarchs uniforms. The Mariners beat the Royals 6 to 2 in front of 39,157 fans at the Kingdome.
Randy Johnson won the Cy Young Award. The award came at the end of a banner year. Johnson (18-2, 2.48 ERA, 294 strikeouts) narrowly missed becoming the first AL Triple Crown pitcher (leading the league in wins, ERA, and strikeouts) since Detroit's Hal Newhouser accomplished the feat in 1945. His .900 winning percentage broke Ron Guidry's 1978 record, and his strikeouts per nine innings ratio of 12.35 broke the record held by Nolan Ryan.

Opening Day lineup
 Darren Bragg
 Joey Cora
 Ken Griffey Jr.
 Jay Buhner
 Edgar Martinez
 Tino Martinez
 Mike Blowers
 Dan Wilson
 Félix Fermín
 Randy Johnson

Roster

Notable transactions
 May 15: Roger Salkeld was traded by the Mariners to the Cincinnati Reds for Tim Belcher.
 July 14: Norm Charlton was signed by the Mariners after being released by the Cincinnati Reds 
 July 31: Ron Villone and Marc Newfield were traded by the Mariners to the San Diego Padres for Andy Benes and a player to be named later. The Padres sent Greg Keagle to the Mariners on September 17.
 August 15: The Mariners traded a player to be named later to the Kansas City Royals for Vince Coleman. The Mariners sent Jim Converse to the Royals on August 18.

Draft picks
 June 1: 1995 Major League Baseball draft
Shane Monahan was drafted by the Mariners in the second round, and signed on June 27, 1995.
Juan Pierre was drafted by the Mariners in the thirtieth round, but did not sign.

Pennant chase
On the morning of August 21, the Mariners were 12½ games behind the Angels. Two weeks later, the lead was down to 5½ games, as the Angels went 1–12 while the M's were 8–5. Seattle led by as many as three games.

Season standings

Note: Teams played 144 games instead of the normal 162 as a consequence of the 1994 strike.Seattle and California each played 145 games due to the one-game tiebreaker.

Record vs. opponents

Game log

Regular season

|-style=background:#bfb
| 1 || April 27 || Tigers || 3–0 || Johnson (1–0) || Bergman (0–1) || Ayala (1) || 34,656 || 1–0 || W1
|-style=background:#bfb
| 2 || April 28 || Tigers || 9–2 || Bosio (1–0) || Doherty (0–1) || — || 19,336 || 2–0 || W2
|-style=background:#bfb
| 3 || April 29 || Tigers || 11–1 || Fleming (1–0) || D. Wells (0–1) || Converse (1) || 27,264 || 3–0 || W3
|-style=background:#fbb
| 4 || April 30 || Tigers || 1–10 || Moore (2–0) || B. Wells (0–1) || — || 19,743 || 3–1 || L1
|-

|-style=background:#bfb
| 5 || May 1 || @ Rangers || 4–1 || Davis (1–0) || Rogers (0–2) || Ayala (2) || 19,104 || 4–1 || W1
|-style=background:#bfb
| 6 || May 2 || @ Rangers || 15–3 || Nelson (1–0) || Heredia (0–1) || — || 17,983 || 5–1 || W2
|-style=background:#bfb
| 7 || May 3 || @ Rangers || 5–1 || Bosio (2–0) || Pavlik (0–1) || — || 17,375 || 6–1 || W3
|-style=background:#fbb
| 8 || May 5 || @ Angels || 0–10 || Patterson (1–0) || Fleming (1–1) || — || 30,230 || 6–2 || L1
|-style=background:#fbb
| 9 || May 6 || @ Angels || 5–7 || Williams (1–1) || Wells (0–2) || L. Smith (4) || 21,882 || 6–3 || L2
|-style=background:#bfb
| 10 || May 7 || @ Angels || 3–2 || Johnson (2–0) || Finley (0–3) || Ayala (3) || 24,868 || 7–3 || W1
|-style=background:#fbb
| 11 || May 9 || @ Athletics || 5–7 || Wengert (1–1) || Converse (0–1) || — || 8,125 || 7–4 || L1
|-style=background:#fbb
| 12 || May 10 || @ Athletics || 4–7 || Ontiveros (2–1) || Fleming (1–2) || Eckersley (4) || 8,495 || 7–5 || L2
|-style=background:#fbb
| 13 || May 11 || @ Athletics || 1–3 || Harkey (1–1) || Villone (0–1) || Eckersley (5) || 9,444 || 7–6 || L3
|-style=background:#bfb
| 14 || May 12 || White Sox || 6–4 || Johnson (3–0) || Alvarez (1–2) || Risley (1) || 18,166 || 8–6 || W1
|-style=background:#bfb
| 15 || May 13 || White Sox || 6–5 || Davis (2–0) || Fernandez (1–2) || Ayala (4) || 40,653 || 9–6 || W2
|-style=background:#fbb
| 16 || May 14 || White Sox || 2–10 || Abbott (2–1) || Converse (0–2) || — || 19,475 || 9–7 || L1
|-style=background:#fbb
| 17 || May 16 || @ Royals || 2–4 (5) || Haney (1–0) || Fleming (1–3) || — || 12,330 || 9–8 || L2
|-style=background:#bfb
| 18 || May 17 || @ Royals || 4–0 || Wells (1–2) || Gubicza (1–3) || — || 12,020 || 10–8 || W1
|-style=background:#fbb
| 19 || May 18 || @ Royals || 2–3 (14) || Brewer (1–1) || Converse (0–3) || — || 14,793 || 10–9 || L1
|-style=background:#fbb
| 20 || May 19 || @ Twins || 6–8 || Radke (2–1) || Davis (2–1) || Aguilera (6) || 14,639 || 10–10 || L2
|-style=background:#bfb
| 21 || May 20 || @ Twins || 10–6 || Belcher (1–0) || Erickson (1–4) || — || 13,762 || 11–10 || W1
|-style=background:#bfb
| 22 || May 21 || @ Twins || 5–2 || Johnson (4–0) || Tapani (2–2) || Ayala (5) || 12,918 || 12–10 || W2
|-style=background:#fbb
| 23 || May 22 || @ Tigers || 8–10 || Boever (3–0) || Carmona (0–1) || Henneman (4) || 9,167 || 12–11 || L1
|-style=background:#fbb
| 24 || May 23 || Red Sox || 4–5 (10) || Belinda (3–0) || Frey (0–2) || Ryan (3) || 11,868 || 12–12 || L2
|-style=background:#bfb
| 25 || May 24 || Red Sox || 15–6 || Carmona (1–1) || Pierce (0–3) || Nelson (1) || 10,041 || 13–12 || W1
|-style=background:#bfb
| 26 || May 25 || Red Sox || 4–3 || Belcher (2–0) || Z. Smith (0–1) || Ayala (6) || 12,194 || 14–12 || W2
|-style=background:#bfb
| 27 || May 26 || Orioles || 8–3 || Johnson (5–0) || McDonald (0–2) || — || 15,256 || 15–12 || W3
|-style=background:#fbb
| 28 || May 27 || Orioles || 4–11 || Mills (3–0) || Wells (1–3) || — || 20,797 || 15–13 || L1
|-style=background:#bfb
| 29 || May 28 || Orioles || 5–2 || Bosio (3–0) || Brown (4–2) || Ayala (7) || 16,785 || 16–13 || W1
|-style=background:#bfb
| 30 || May 29 || Yankees || 8–7 (12) || Ayala (1–0) || Bankhead (1–1) || — || 18,948 || 17–13 || W2
|-style=background:#bfb
| 31 || May 30 || Yankees || 7–3 || Nelson (2–0) || Perez (2–2) || — || 10,709 || 18–13 || W3
|-style=background:#bfb
| 32 || May 31 || Yankees || 11–9 || Wells (2–3) || MacDonald (0–1) || Ayala (8) || 13,035 || 19–13 || W4
|-

|-style=background:#fbb
| 33 || June 2 || @ Red Sox || 5–6 || Belinda (4–0) || Torres (0–2) || — || 33,476 || 19–14 || L1
|-style=background:#fbb
| 34 || June 3 || @ Red Sox || 8–10 || Cormier (2–0) || Carmona (1–2) || Ryan (6) || 27,301 || 19–15 || L2
|-style=background:#fbb
| 35 || June 4 || @ Red Sox || 1–2 (10) || Wakefield (3–0) || Ayala (1–1) || — || 28,512 || 19–16 || L3
|-style=background:#bfb
| 36 || June 5 || @ Orioles || 2–0 || Johnson (6–0) || McDonald (1–3) || — || 36,732 || 20–16 || W1
|-style=background:#fbb
| 37 || June 6 || @ Orioles || 6–12 || Moyer (1–1) || Fleming (1–4) || — || 33,556 || 20–17 || L1
|-style=background:#bfb
| 38 || June 7 || @ Orioles || 10–2 || Bosio (4–0) || Brown (5–3) || — || 38,407 || 21–17 || W1
|-style=background:#fbb
| 39 || June 8 || @ Orioles || 2–8 || Mussina (5–3) || Torres (0–3) || — || 40,730 || 21–18 || L1
|-style=background:#bfb
| 40 || June 9 || @ Yankees || 11–1 || Belcher (3–0) || Perez (3–3) || — || 19,650 || 22–18 || W1
|-style=background:#bfb
| 41 || June 10 || @ Yankees || 3–2 || Nelson (3–0) || Howe (1–2) || Ayala (9) || 25,279 || 23–18 || W2
|-style=background:#fbb
| 42 || June 11 || @ Yankees || 7–10 || Howe (2–2) || Frey (0–3) || Wetteland (7) || 26,037 || 23–19 || L1
|-style=background:#fbb
| 43 || June 12 || Royals || 9–10 || Meacham (2–2) || Villone (0–2) || Montgomery (9) || 11,628 || 23–20 || L2
|-style=background:#fbb
| 44 || June 13 || Royals || 1–3 || Haney (3–1) || Torres (0–4) || Montgomery (10) || 10,223 || 23–21 || L3
|-style=background:#fbb
| 45 || June 14 || Royals || 1–2 || Appier (9–2) || Belcher (3–1) || Montgomery (11) || 12,585 || 23–22 || L4
|-style=background:#fbb
| 46 || June 16 || Twins || 1–10 || Radke (3–6) || Johnson (6–1) || — || 20,762 || 23–23 || L5
|-style=background:#bfb
| 47 || June 17 || Twins || 6–4 || Bosio (5–0) || Trombley (0–2) || Ayala (10) || 16,751 || 24–23 || W1
|-style=background:#bfb
| 48 || June 18 || Twins || 2–1 || Risley (1–0) || Tapani (4–6) || — || 24,707 || 25–23 || W2
|-style=background:#fbb
| 49 || June 19 || @ White Sox || 6–8 || McCaskill (3–2) || Fleming (1–5) || Hernandez (11) || 22,406 || 25–24 || L1
|-style=background:#bfb
| 50 || June 20 || @ White Sox || 9–5 || Johnson (7–1) || Alvarez (1–2) || — || 25,868 || 26–24 || W1
|-style=background:#fbb
| 51 || June 21 || @ White Sox || 4–5 (10) || McCaskill (4–2) || Risley (1–1) || — || 21,228 || 26–25 || L1
|-style=background:#bfb
| 52 || June 22 || @ White Sox || 3–2 || Torres (1–4) || Abbott (3–3) || Ayala (11) || 20,836 || 27–25 || W1 
|-style=background:#fbb
| 53 || June 23 || Angels || 4–14 || Langston (6–1) || Belcher (3–2) || — || 14,282 || 27–26 || L1
|-style=background:#bfb
| 54 || June 24 || Angels || 3–2 || Johnson (8–1) || Finley (5–6) || — || 31,275 || 28–26 || W1
|-style=background:#fbb
| 55 || June 25 || Angels || 5–7 || Boskie (6–1) || Bosio (5–1) || Smith (19) || 14,325 || 28–27 || L1
|-style=background:#bfb
| 56 || June 26 || Angels || 7–3 || Torres (2–4) || Anderson (1–1) || — || 18,126 || 29–27 || W1
|-style=background:#fbb
| 57 || June 27 || Athletics || 4–6 || Harkey (4–4) || Belcher (3–3) || Eckersley (16) || 9,767 || 29–28 || L1
|-style=background:#fbb
| 58 || June 28 || Athletics || 5–7 || Van Poppel (1–1) || Nelson (3–1) || — || 15,165 || 29–29 || L2
|-style=background:#bfb
| 59 || June 29 || Athletics || 5–2 || Bosio (6–1) || Arce (1–2) || Ayala (12) || 13,701 || 30–29 || W1 
|-style=background:#fbb
| 60 || June 30 || Rangers || 2–10 || Gross (3–7) || Torres (2–5) || — || 12,137 || 30–30 || L1
|-

|-style=background:#bfb
| 61 || July 1 || Rangers || 2–0 || Belcher (4–3) || Pavlik (4–4) || Ayala (13) || 17,323 || 31–30 || W1 
|-style=background:#bfb
| 62 || July 2 || Rangers || 4–3 || Ayala (2–1) || Whiteside (2–2) || — || 19,404 || 32–30 || W2
|-style=background:#fbb
| 63 || July 3 || @ Tigers || 2–4 || D. Wells (7–3) || Bosio (6–2) || Henneman (15) || 23,780 || 32–31 || L1
|-style=background:#fbb
| 64 || July 4 || @ Tigers || 8–9 || Christopher (1–0) || Ayala (2–2) || — || 20,188 || 32–32 || L2
|-style=background:#fbb
| 65 || July 5 || @ Tigers || 6–8 || Christopher (2–0) || Carmona (1–3) || Henneman (16) || 17,224 || 32–33 || L3
|-style=background:#fbb
| 66 || July 6 || @ Indians || 1–8 || Ogea (5–1) || Belcher (4–4) || — || 41,661 || 32–34 || L4
|-style=background:#bfb
| 67 || July 7 || @ Indians || 5–3 || Johnson (9–1) || Clark (4–3) || — || 41,741 || 33–34 || W1
|-style=background:#fbb
| 68 || July 8 || @ Indians || 3–7 || Nagy (7–4) || Bosio (6–3) || — || 41,893 || 33–35 || L1
|-style=background:#bfb
| 69 || July 9 || @ Indians || 9–3 || Torres (3–5) || Hershiser (5–4) || — || 41,897 || 34–35 || W1
|-style=background:#bbbfff
| - || July 11 || colspan="8"|66th All-Star Game in Arlington, TX
|-style=background:#fbb
| 70 || July 13 || Blue Jays || 1–4 || Cone (8–5) || Belcher (4–5) || Castillo (4) || 18,616 || 34–36 || L1
|-style=background:#fbb
| 71 || July 14 || Blue Jays || 1–5 || Guzman (3–5) || Bosio (6–4) || — || 14,850 || 34–37 || L2
|-style=background:#bfb
| 72 || July 15 || Blue Jays || 3–0 || Johnson (10–1) || Hentgen (6–7) || — || 36,037 || 35–37 || W1
|-style=background:#fbb
| 73 || July 16 || Blue Jays || 3–9 || Hurtado (1–0) || Carmona (1–4) || — || 17,632 || 35–38 || L1
|-style=background:#bfb
| 74 || July 17 || Tigers || 10–6 (10) || Ayala (3–2) || Groom (1–3) || — || 14,358 || 36–38 || W1
|-style=background:#bfb
| 75 || July 18 || Tigers || 10–6 || Belcher (5–5) || Lima (0–1) || — || 14,667 || 37–38 || W2
|-style=background:#fbb
| 76 || July 19 || @ Brewers || 6–7 (12) || Wegman (3–3) || Ayala (3–3) || — || 14,175 || 37–39 || L1
|-style=background:#bfb
| 77 || July 20 || @ Brewers || 4–2 (13) || Krueger (1–0) || McAndrew (0–1) || — || 21,211 || 38–39 || W1
|-style=background:#fbb
| 78 || July 21 || @ Blue Jays || 3–4 || Hurtado (2–0) || Torres (3–6) || Castillo (6) || 36,490 || 38–40 || L1
|-style=background:#bfb
| 79 || July 22 || @ Blue Jays || 7–2 || Belcher (6–5) || Leiter (6–6) || — || 43,483 || 39–40 || W1
|-style=background:#bfb
| 80 || July 23 || @ Blue Jays || 6–4 || B. Wells (3–3) || Cone (9–6) || Ayala (14) || 39,163 || 40–40 || W2 
|-style=background:#fbb
| 81 || July 24 || Brewers || 4–6 || Bones (6–7) || Bosio (6–5) || Fetters (13) || 10,491 || 40–41 || L1
|-style=background:#bfb
| 82 || July 25 || Brewers || 8–6 || Johnson (11–1) || Karl (1–1) || Ayala (15) || 13,427 || 41–41 || W1
|-style=background:#fbb
| 83 || July 26 || Brewers || 3–4 || Givens (2–2) || Torres (3–7) || Fetters (14) || 11,315 || 41–42 || L1
|-style=background:#bfb
| 84 || July 27 || Indians || 11–5 || Belcher (7–5) || Ogea (5–3) || — || 20,121 || 42–42 || W1
|-style=background:#fbb
| 85 || July 28 || Indians || 5–6 || Plunk (5–1) || Frey (0–4) || Mesa (28) || 17,609 || 42–43 || L1
|-style=background:#bfb
| 86 || July 29 || Indians || 5–3 || Bosio (7–5) || Embree (2–1) || Ayala (16) || 43,874 || 43–43 || W1
|-style=background:#fbb
| 87 || July 30 || Indians || 2–5 || Hershiser (8–5) || Torres (3–8) || Mesa (29) || 24,089 || 43–44 || L1
|-

|-style=background:#fbb
| 88 || August 1 || @ Angels || 2–7 || Anderson (6–2) || Johnson (11–2) || — || 22,074 || 43–45 || L2 
|-style=background:#fbb
| 89 || August 2 || @ Angels || 4–5 || Harkey (6–6) || Belcher (7–6) || Smith (25) || 23,253 || 43–46 || L3
|-style=background:#bfb
| 90 || August 3 || @ Angels || 10–7 || Benes (5–7) || Abbott (7–5) || Charlton (1) || 34,674 || 44–46 || W1
|-style=background:#fbb
| 91 || August 4 || @ Athletics || 8–9 || Eckersley (3–4) || Ayala (3–4) || — || 11,794 || 44–47 || L1
|-style=background:#bfb
| 92 || August 5 || @ Athletics || 15–9 || Wells (4–3) || Briscoe (0–1) || — || 20,787 || 45–47 || W1
|-style=background:#bfb
| 93 || August 6 || @ Athletics || 15–8 || Krueger (2–0) || Stottlemyre (9–4) || — || 20,368 || 46–47 || W2
|-style=background:#bfb
| 94 || August 7 || White Sox || 6–4 || Belcher (8–6) || Alvarez (4–7) || Charlton (2) || 18,852 || 47–47 || W3
|-style=background:#bfb
| 95 || August 8 || White Sox || 10–9 || Ayala (4–4) || Hernandez (2–5) || — || 16,875 || 48–47 || W4
|-style=background:#bfb
| 96 || August 9 || White Sox || 11–8 || Bosio (8–5) || Keyser (3–5) || Ayala (17) || 16,401 || 49–47 || W5
|-style=background:#bfb
| 97 || August 11 || @ Royals || 2–1 || Johnson (12–2) || Gubicza (8–10) || Ayala (18) || 19,955 || 50–47 || W6
|-style=background:#fbb
| 98 || August 12 || @ Royals || 2–7 || Appier (12–7) || Belcher (8–7) || Meacham (1) || 20,572 || 50–48 || L1
|-style=background:#fbb
| 99 || August 13 || @ Royals || 3–6 || Gordon (8–7) || Krueger (2–1) || Montgomery (20) || 19,489 || 50–49 || L2
|-style=background:#bfb
| 100 || August 14 || @ Twins || 6–2 || Benes (6–7) || Trombley (2–7) || Nelson (2) || 16,637 || 51–49 || W1
|-style=background:#fbb
| 101 || August 15 || @ Twins || 6–7 || Munoz (1–0) || Ayala (4–5) || — || 12,595 || 51–50 || L1
|-style=background:#bfb
| 102 || August 16 || @ Twins || 6–4 || Risley (2–1) || Stevens (3–2) || Ayala (19) || 13,426 || 52–50 || W1
|-style=background:#fbb
| 103 || August 17 || @ Athletics || 2–3 || Honeycutt (5–1) || Charlton (2–6) || — || 10,191 || 52–51 || L1
|-style=background:#bfb
| 104 || August 18 || Red Sox || 9–3 || Wolcott (1–0) || Wakefield (14–2) || — || 27,256 || 53–51 || W1
|-style=background:#fbb
| 105 || August 19 || Red Sox || 3–4 || Hanson (12–4) || Benes (6–8) || Aguilera (21) || 36,007 || 53–52 || L1
|-style=background:#fbb
| 106 || August 20 || Red Sox || 6–7 || Cormier (6–3) || Bosio (8–6) || Aguilera (22) || 21,813 || 53–53 || L2
|-style=background:#bfb
| 107 || August 21 || Orioles || 6–0 || Nelson (4–1) || Benitez (1–5) || — || 32,525 || 54–53 || W1
|-style=background:#fbb
| 108 || August 22 || Orioles || 1–2 || Mussina (14–7) || Belcher (8–8) || Jones (20) || 13,631 || 54–54 || L1
|-style=background:#fbb
| 109 || August 23 || Orioles || 1–7 || Krivda (2–2) || Wolcott (1–1) || Benitez (2) || 14,937 || 54–55 || L2
|-style=background:#bfb
| 110 || August 24 || Yankees || 9–7 || Nelson (5–1) || Wetteland (1–4) || — || 17,592 || 55–55 || W1
|-style=background:#bfb
| 111 || August 25 || Yankees || 7–4 || Bosio (9–6) || Pettitte (6–8) || — || 28,130 || 56–55 || W2
|-style=background:#bfb
| 112 || August 26 || Yankees || 7–0 || Johnson (13–2) || Hitchcock (6–9) || — || 41,182 || 57–55 || W3
|-style=background:#fbb
| 113 || August 27 || Yankees || 2–5 || Kamieniecki (4–5) || Belcher (8–9) || Wetteland (23) || 24,913 || 57–56 || L1
|-style=background:#bfb
| 114 || August 29 || @ Red Sox || 6–4 || Benes (7–8) || Wakefield (14–3) || Charlton (3) || 31,328 || 58–56 || W1
|-style=background:#fbb
| 115 || August 30 || @ Red Sox || 6–7 || Maddux (4–1) || Nelson (5–2) || Aguilera (26) || 32,356 || 58–57 || L1
|-style=background:#bfb
| 116 || August 31 || @ Red Sox || 11–2 || Wolcott (2–1) || Cormier (6–5) || Guetterman (1) || 30,627 || 59–57 || W1
|-

|-style=background:#bfb
| 117 || September 1 || @ Orioles || 4–3 || Belcher (9–9) || Mussina (15–8) || Charlton (4) || 43,447 || 60–57 || W2
|-style=background:#fbb
| 118 || September 2 || @ Orioles || 2–3 || Brown (7–8) || Bosio (9–7) || Jones (21) || 46,731 || 60–58 || L1
|-style=background:#bfb
| 119 || September 3 || @ Orioles || 9–6 || Carmona (2–4) || Krivda (2–3) || Charlton (5) || 46,269 || 61–58 || W1
|-style=background:#fbb
| 120 || September 4 || @ Yankees || 3–13 || Pettitte (8–8) || Torres (3–9) || — || 24,855 || 61–59 || L1
|-style=background:#bfb
| 121 || September 5 || @ Yankees || 6–5 || Wolcott (3–1) || Rivera (5–3) || Charlton (6) || 15,340 || 62–59 || W1
|-style=background:#fbb
| 122 || September 6 || @ Yankees || 3–4 || McDowell (13–10) || Belcher (9–10) || — || 15,426 || 62–60 || L1
|-style=background:#fbb
| 123 || September 7 || @ Indians || 1–4 || Nagy (13–5) || Bosio (9–8) || Mesa (39) || 41,450 || 62–61 || L2
|-style=background:#bfb
| 124 || September 8 || Royals || 4–1 || Johnson (14–2) || Jacome (4–7) || Charlton (7) || 19,350 || 63–61 || W1
|-style=background:#bfb
| 125 || September 9 || Royals || 6–2 || Benes (8–8) || Gubicza (10–13) || — || 39,157 || 64–61 || W2
|-style=background:#bfb
| 126 || September 10 || Royals || 5–4 || Ayala (5–5) || Olson (3–2) || Charlton (8) || 18,066 || 65–61 || W3
|-style=background:#fbb
| 127 || September 11 || Twins || 10–12 || Mahomes (4–7) || Nelson (5–3) || Stevens (9) || 18,193 || 65–62 || L1
|-style=background:#bfb
| 128 || September 12 || Twins || 14–3 || Bosio (10–8) || Rodriguez (5–6) || Carmona (1) || 12,102 || 66–62 || W1
|-style=background:#bfb
| 129 || September 13 || Twins || 7–4 || Nelson (6–3) || Mahomes (4–8) || Charlton (9) || 16,469 || 67–62 || W2
|-style=background:#bfb
| 130 || September 15 || @ White Sox || 3–2 || Benes (9–8) || Bere (7–13) || Charlton (10) || 19,100 || 68–62 || W3
|-style=background:#bfb
| 131 || September 16 || @ White Sox || 5–3 || Belcher (10–10) || Karchner (3–2) || Charlton (11) || 26,073 || 69–62 || W4
|-style=background:#fbb
| 132 || September 17 || @ White Sox || 1–2 || McCaskill (5–4) || Wolcott (3–2) || Hernandez (30) || 21,913 || 69–63 || L1
|-style=background:#bfb
| 133 || September 18 || Rangers || 8–1 || Johnson (15–2) || Witt (5–10) || — || 29,515 || 70–63 || W1
|-style=background:#bfb
| 134 || September 19 || Rangers || 5–4 (11) || Charlton (3–6) || McDowell (6–4) || — || 20,410 || 71–63 || W2
|-style=background:#bfb
| 135 || September 20 || Rangers || 11–3 || Benes (10–8) || Tewksbury (8–7) || — || 26,524 || 72–63 || W3
|-style=background:#bfb
| 136 || September 22 || Athletics || 10–7 || Nelson (7–3) || Corsi (2–4) || Charlton (12) || 51,500 || 73–63 || W4
|-style=background:#bfb
| 137 || September 23 || Athletics || 7–0 || Johnson (16–2) || Johns (5–2) || — || 54,589 || 74–63 || W5
|-style=background:#bfb
| 138 || September 24 || Athletics || 9–8 || Charlton (4–6) || Eckersley (4–6) || — || 46,714 || 75–63 || W6
|-style=background:#bfb
| 139 || September 26 || Angels || 10–2 || Benes (11–8) || Boskie (7–7) || — || 46,935 || 76–63 || W7
|-style=background:#fbb
| 140 || September 27 || Angels || 0–2 || Finley (14–12) || Belcher (10–11) || Smith (35) || 50,212 || 76–64 || L1
|-style=background:#bfb
| 141 || September 28 || @ Rangers || 6–2 || Johnson (17–2) || Pavlik (10–10) || Charlton (13) || 21,502 || 77–64 || W1
|-style=background:#bfb
| 142 || September 29 || @ Rangers || 4–3 || Ayala (6–5) || Vosberg (5–5) || Charlton (14) || 25,336 || 78–64 || W2
|-style=background:#fbb
| 143 || September 30 || @ Rangers || 2–9 || Gross (9–15) || Benes (11–9) || — || 33,792 || 78–65 || L1
|-

|-style=background:#fbb
| 144 || October 1 || @ Rangers || 3–9 || Rogers (17–7) || Belcher (10–12) || Whiteside (3) || 25,714 || 78–66 || L2
|-style=background:#bfb
| 145 || October 2 || Angels || 9–1 || Johnson (18–2) || Langston (15–7) || — || 52,356 || 79–66 || W1
|-

|- style="text-align:center;"
| Legend:       = Win       = Loss       = PostponementBold = Mariners team member

Postseason

|- bgcolor=#ffcccc
| 1 || October 3 || @ Yankees || Yankee Stadium || 6–9 || Cone (1–0) || Nelson (0–1) || — || 57,178 || 0–1
|- bgcolor=#ffcccc
| 2 || October 4 || @ Yankees || Yankee Stadium || 5–7 (15) || Rivera (1–0) || Belcher (0–1) || — || 57,126 || 0–2
|- bgcolor=#ccffcc
| 3 || October 6 || Yankees || Kingdome || 7–4 || Johnson (1–0) || McDowell (0–1) || Charlton (1) || 57,944 || 1–2
|- bgcolor=#ccffcc
| 4 || October 7 || Yankees || Kingdome || 11–8 || Charlton (1–0) || Wetteland (0–1) || Risley (1) || 57,180 || 2–2
|- bgcolor=#ccffcc
| 5 || October 8 || Yankees || Kingdome || 6–5 (11) || Johnson (2–0) || McDowell (0–2) || — || 57,411 || 3–2

|- bgcolor=#ccffcc
| 1 || October 10 || Indians || Kingdome || 3–2 || Wolcott (1–0) || Martinez (0–1) || Charlton (1) || 57,065 || 1–0
|- bgcolor=#ffcccc
| 2 || October 11 || Indians || Kingdome || 2–5 || Hershiser (1–0) || Belcher (0–1) || — || 58,144 || 1–1
|- bgcolor=#ccffcc
| 3 || October 13 || @ Indians || Jacobs Field || 5–2 (11) || Charlton (1–0) || Tavarez (0–1) || — || 43,643 || 2–1
|- bgcolor=#ffcccc
| 4 || October 14 || @ Indians || Jacobs Field || 0–7 || Hill (1–0) || Benes (0–1) || — || 43,686 || 2–2
|- bgcolor=#ffcccc
| 5 || October 15 || @ Indians || Jacobs Field || 2–3 || Hershiser (2–0) || Bosio (0–1) || Mesa (1) || 43,607 || 2–3
|- bgcolor=#ffcccc
| 6 || October 17 || Indians || Kingdome || 0–4 || Martinez (1–1) || Johnson (0–1) || — || 58,489 || 2–4

Player stats

Batting

Starters by position
Note: Pos = Position; G = Games played; AB = At bats; H = Hits; Avg. = Batting average; HR = Home runs; RBI = Runs batted in

Other batters
Note: Pos = Position; G = Games played; AB = At bats; H = Hits; Avg. = Batting average; HR = Home runs; RBI = Runs batted in

Pitching

Starting pitchers
Note: GS = Games started; IP = Innings pitched; W = Wins; L = Losses; ERA = Earned run average; SO = Strikeouts

Other pitchers
Note: G = Games pitched; IP = Innings pitched; W = Wins; L = Losses; ERA = Earned run average; SO = Strikeouts

Relief pitchers
Note: G = Games pitched; IP = Innings pitched; W = Wins; L = Losses; ERA = Earned run average; SO = Strikeouts; SV = Saves

ALDS

ALCS

Awards and honors
 Randy Johnson, American League Cy Young Award winner, American League leader, strikeouts
 Edgar Martínez, American League Leader, batting average
 Lou Piniella, Associated Press American League Manager of the Year

In popular culture
The Mariners' ALDS run is the subject of the song, My Oh My, by Seattle-based rapper, Macklemore.

Chicago-based band Coping has a song titled "'95 Mariners."

In July 2019, the MLB Network released MLB Network Presents: The 1995 Mariners, Saving Baseball in Seattle.

See also
The Double (Seattle Mariners)

Farm system

References

External links
1995 Seattle Mariners at Baseball Reference
1995 Seattle Mariners team page at www.baseball-almanac.com
A fan site collecting stories about the team and year
1995 Mariners: Ringless in Seattle

Seattle Mariners seasons
American League West champion seasons
Seattle Mariners
Seattle
Seattle Marin